Eric Christian Tostrud (born 1965) is a United States district judge of the United States District Court for the District of Minnesota.

Education and career 
Tostrud was born in St. Paul, Minnesota in 1965.  He received his B.A. in Political Science and Speech cum laude from St. Olaf College in 1987.  Tostrud received his Juris Doctor summa cum laude from William Mitchell College of Law in 1990, and he was admitted to the Minnesota Bar in October 1990.  He clerked for Edward J. Devitt of the U.S. District Court for the District of Minnesota from 1990 to 1992.

Tostrud spent his entire career as a practicing lawyer with the Minneapolis firm Lockridge Grindal Nauen.  He was an associate with the firm from 1992 to 1997, a partner from 1998 through 2014, and of counsel from 2015 through his appointment to the federal bench.  During his time with the firm, Tostrud maintained a complex litigation practice concentrated almost exclusively in the federal courts, primarily in the health care law, insurance coverage, fraud, and financial services fields.  His pro bono service included representing military veterans before the U.S. Court of Appeals for Veterans Claims. 

While in practice, Tostrud taught often as an adjunct professor at William Mitchell College of Law and at the University of Minnesota Law School. In 2015, Tostrud began teaching law full time as a Distinguished Practitioner in Residence, first at William Mitchell and then at Mitchell Hamline School of Law.  Tostrud's areas of teaching included legal writing, the federal courts, federal jurisdiction, federal civil procedure, complex litigation, electronic discovery, and the business of lawyering.  Tostrud's service as a member of the Mitchell Hamline faculty ended with his judicial appointment.

Federal judicial service 

In 2017, Tostrud was recommended for a federal judgeship by Congressman Erik Paulsen  On February 12, 2018, President Donald Trump announced his intent to nominate Tostrud to an undetermined seat on the United States District Court for the District of Minnesota. On February 15, 2018, his nomination was sent to the Senate. Tostrud was nominated to the seat on the United States District Court for the District of Minnesota vacated by Donovan W. Frank, who assumed senior status on October 31, 2016. On April 11, 2018, a hearing on his nomination was held before the Senate Judiciary Committee. On May 10, 2018, his nomination was reported out of committee by a voice vote. On September 6, 2018, his nomination was confirmed by voice vote. He received his judicial commission on September 10, 2018.

Community involvement 
Tostrud has served his community in a variety of ways.  Among the more significant points of service, he has been active in his church, Augustana Lutheran Church in West St. Paul, Minnesota, serving on council and as congregational president, among other activities.  He served as a trustee of William Mitchell College of Law from 2006 to 2015.  He founded the Kloeck-Jenson Endowment for Peace and Justice Studies at St. Olaf College in 2001, a program that continues to fund student opportunities for social entrepreneurship and public service.  Tostrud also spent considerable time volunteering and coaching in the West St. Paul Area Youth Hockey Association.

References

External links 
 

1965 births
20th-century American lawyers
21st-century American lawyers
21st-century American judges
Judges of the United States District Court for the District of Minnesota
Living people
Minnesota lawyers
Minnesota Republicans
Hamline University School of Law alumni
People from Saint Paul, Minnesota
St. Olaf College alumni
United States district court judges appointed by Donald Trump
University of Minnesota Law School faculty
William Mitchell College of Law alumni